L'Honor-de-Cos is a commune in the Tarn-et-Garonne department in the Occitanie region in southern France.

The Château of Loubéjac lies in the commune.

See also
Communes of the Tarn-et-Garonne department

References

Communes of Tarn-et-Garonne